Teretia teres is a species of sea snail, a marine gastropod mollusk in the family Raphitomidae.

Taxonomy
Considered as specifically distinct from Teretia anceps (Eichwald, 1830), a Miocene fossil species, by Bouchet & Warén (1980).

Description
Shell up to 12 mm high, fusiform with acute spire and body whorl occupying about 60% of the total height. Protoconch small, with 4 convex whorls and a sculpture of oblique threads forming a delicate reticulate pattern. Teleoconch with a sculpture of regular, high spiral cords; there are three cords on the first teleoconch whorl and the number increases by intercalation of additional cords in the later whorls. Interspaces of cord filled wit delicate raised lines, parallel to growth lines. Body whorl markedly constricted around the siphonal canal. Aperture lanceolate, with outer lip simple and fragile, curved in lateral view and forming a very deep notch immediately beneath the suture. Protoconch dark brown, teleoconch beige, sometimes with darker suubsutural blotches or flames.

Distribution
This species occurs in the Northern Atlantic Ocean and in the Mediterranean Sea.

References

 Gofas, S.; Le Renard, J.; Bouchet, P. (2001). Mollusca. in: Costello, M.J. et al. (eds), European Register of Marine Species: a check-list of the marine species in Europe and a bibliography of guides to their identification. Patrimoines Naturels. 50: 180–213

External links
 Wood, Searles valentine A monograph of the Crag Mollusca; with descriptipns of shells from the upper Tertiaries of the British Isles; vol. 4 1848 Palaeontographical Society Monographs
  Serge GOFAS, Ángel A. LUQUE, Joan Daniel OLIVER,José TEMPLADO & Alberto SERRA (2021) - The Mollusca of Galicia Bank (NE Atlantic Ocean); European Journal of Taxonomy 785: 1–114

teres
Gastropods described in 1844